Once Just is a three piece rock band with reggae, hip hop and punk influences, from Calgary, Alberta, Canada. They were signed to an offshoot of Sudden Death Records from 2006 to 2009. They requested a release from their label due to inadequate funding. They are the only Canadian act to have played with Canada's Godfather of Punk (Joey "Shithead" Keithley) and Canada's Godfather of HipHop (MC Maestro Fresh Wes) Their album destination was produced by punk rock legend Joey "shithead" Keithley. Once Just was previously called JUST, but changed names to avoid a legal dispute with a now defunct Southern California rock band of the same name. Once Just first hit the national scene in Canada in 2004 when Much Music and Much Loud both picked up the video for the Once Just song "When It's Over", radio stations across Canada soon followed, and the song was a minor hit in Canada, hitting charts across the country. In 2007 the song "Spin It" from the album Destination hit the top 20 Canadian rock tracks on Sirius satellite radio. In 2008, Once Just played Junofest in Calgary for the 2008 Juno's. In the past 5 years, Once Just has played over 500 shows in both Canada and the USA. Once Just has played with such artists as, Jars of Clay, D.O.A. (band), Ill Scarlett, Marianas Trench (band), Rides Again, Staggered Crossing, MoBadAss, Maestro Fresh Wes, Danko Jones and many others.

Once Just has released four full-length albums and 1 EP.

In 2010, Once Just reformed as Wake Up Starlight, a folk-based rock band.

Discography
As Just
How Far the Past is Where to Go (2001)
Imposter (2003)
Stand (2005)

As Once Just
Destination (2006)
Once Just EP (2008)

External links 
 http://WakeUpStarlight.com/
http://ectomag.com/index.php?view=article&id=172&Itemid=2&option=com_content&bsb_midx=-1
http://www.oncejust.com
http://www.sceneandheard.ca/article.php?id=1994&morgue=1

Canadian indie rock groups
Canadian ska groups
Musical groups from Calgary
Musical groups established in 2001
Third-wave ska groups
Reggae rock groups
2001 establishments in Alberta